The Twelfth International Jean Sibelius Violin Competition took place in Helsinki from 18 to 29 May 2022. It was won by South Korean violinist In Mo Yang.

Competition 
The competition was originally scheduled for late 2020 but was postponed until 2022 due to the COVID-19 pandemic. To compensate for this change, violinists born in or after 1990 were still allowed to compete. 204 violinists applied for the competition and 39 ended up participating.

Prizes 
In Mo Yang was declared the winner of the competition and was awarded 30,000 euros, a mentoring prize with Pekka Kuusisto and Sakari Oramo, a product prize from Genelec, and was loaned a 1772 Giovanni Battista Guadagnini violin. He additionally won 2,000 euros by the Sibelius family for the best performance of Magnus Lindberg's "Caprice." Nathan Meltzer was awarded second prize along with 20,000 euros and a product prize from Genelec. Dmytro Udovychenko was awarded third prize and 15,000 euros. The three other finalists were awarded 3,000 euros, and all violinists who advanced to the semi final round were awarded 1,000 euros.

Schedule

Jurors 

  Sakari Oramo (chairman)
  Jaakko Ilves
  Ilya Kaler
  Ida Kavafian
  Henning Kraggerud
  Lucie Robert
  Daniel Rowland
  Elina Vähälä
  Nam Yun Kim (cancelled participation)
  Tong Weidong (cancelled participation)

Results

References 

2022 in Finland
Violin competitions
Jean Sibelius
Music competitions in Finland